The Waitakere rugby league team could mean:
The Waitakere City Raiders who played between 1994 and 1996; or
The Waitakere Rangers who played between 2006 and 2008.